Nitu Kumari also known as Nitu Singh is a member of Indian National Congress and elected representative of Hisua (Vidhan Sabha constituency)

References 

Living people
Year of birth missing (living people)